Prior to this election, and in the three elections since the 2007 municipal reform, no mayor had won re-election.

In the 2017 election, Mikael Smed, from the Social Democrats, won the mayor's position. 
The red bloc parties had won 17 of the 29 seats, so if the blue bloc wanted to take over the mayor's position, it required a net gain of 3 seats.

In the result, the Social Democrats would keep the posiiton as the largest party, but would lose 2 seats. Fellow red bloc parties of the Green Left and Red–Green Alliance would however both gain a seat, and although The Alternative lost a seat, a total of 16 red seats was won. Therefore, it looked as though Mikael Smed was on his way to become the first re-elected in the municipality's history. 
It would eventually be confirmed that he would have a second term.

Electoral system
For elections to Danish municipalities, a number varying from 9 to 31 are chosen to be elected to the municipal council. The seats are then allocated using the D'Hondt method and a closed list proportional representation.
Vordingborg Municipality had 29 seats in 2021

Unlike in Danish General Elections, in elections to municipal councils, electoral alliances are allowed.

Electoral alliances 

Electoral Alliance 1

Electoral Alliance 2

Results

Notes

References 

Vordingborg